Vincent Salafia is an Irish lawyer and environmentalist. Salafia was involved in a legal challenge against Dick Roche, Minister for the Environment, Heritage and Local Government over the M3 Motorway at Tara in 2006.

Brehon Law Project 
In 2000 he founded the Brehon Law Project, to promote academic study into early Irish law or 'Brehon Law'. He held three symposia in Blackhall Place, King's Inns and Trinity College Dublin.

Carrickmines Castle 
In 2002 Salafia became a spokesperson for a group called Carrickminders, which engaged in a campaign to preserve the remains of Carrickmines Castle, an Anglo-Norman fort built in the 12th century on the edge of the Pale. An occupation lasting 6 months led to the declaration that Carrickmines Castle was a National Monument and granting of a Supreme Court injunction that postponed the completion of the M50 motorway for two years. The Government refused to reroute the motorway and facilitated its construction by passing the National Monuments (Amendment) Act 2004.

Hill of Tara / M3 motorway 
Salafia undertook judicial review of the decision of the Minister to give directions, under the National Monuments Act 2004, to proceed with excavations of 38 sites between Navan and Dunshaughlin along the pathway of the M3 motorway. On 1 March 2006 Mr Justice Thomas Smyth ruled against Salafia in the High Court. Salafia faced a legal bill of €600,000.

The National Roads Authority have claimed that Salafia's objections have cost the taxpayers of Ireland millions of euros, with the delays costing €1 million per week . He has also been accused by the National Roads Authority of "endangering the public" because the new motorway will separate traffic and save lives. Salafia has denied these claims both in court and in the media.

References

 Leonard, Dr. Liam, Green Nation: the Irish Environmental Movement from Carnsore Point to the Rossport 5 Choice Publishing (2006)  Chapter 12 (seeking page numbers)

External links 
Brehon Law Project
Brehon Law Project - Email discussion list and archive
Symposium I - Blackhall Place, Dublin 2001
Symposium II - King's Inns &  Mansion House, Dublin 2002
Symposium III - Trinity College & Royal Irish Academy, Dublin 2003

Carrickmines Castle - M50 motorway
Carrickmines Castle I: Supreme Court 2003
Carrickmines Castle II: Supreme Court 2004
Carrickmines Castle III: High Court 2005 - awaiting Supreme Court ruling

Hill of Tara - M3 motorway
Official litigation website
TaraWatch campaign group

Media Reports
The Guardian: 'Land of High Kings is battlefield for fight between heritage and growth'
RTE News: Challenge to M3 begins in High Court
RTE News: Leave is given in motorway challenge
Irish Times: Minister to press ahead with Tara route for motorway
Environment Magazine - 'Next left: high kings, pagan overthrow' April 2005
Washington Post. 'In Ireland, Commuters vs. Kings' 01-22-05
Sunday Times: Theron Brushes up on the Hill of Tara

1966 births
21st-century Irish lawyers
Living people
20th-century Irish lawyers